John Robert "Haj" Ross (born May 7, 1938) is an American poet and linguist. He played a part in the development of generative semantics (as opposed to interpretive semantics) along with George Lakoff, James D. McCawley, and Paul Postal. He was a professor of linguistics at MIT from 1966–1985 and has worked in Brazil, Singapore and British Columbia, and until spring 2021, he taught at the University of North Texas.

Ross's 1967 MIT dissertation is a landmark in syntactic theory and documents in great detail Ross's discovery of syntactic islands.

Ross is also well known for his onomastic fecundity; he has coined many new terms describing syntactic phenomena that are well known to this day, including copula switch, Do-Gobbling, freeze(s), gapping, heavy NP shift, (inner) islands, myopia, the penthouse principle, pied piping, pruning, scrambling, siamese sentences, sluicing, slifting, sloppy identity, squib, squishes and syntactic islands.

Biography
As a student, Ross was exposed to many influential figures within the field. Ross was a student of Bernard Bloch, Samuel Martin and Rulon Wells at Yale University; Zellig Harris, Henry Hiz, Henry Hoenigswald and Franklin Southworth at the University of Pennsylvania; and Roman Jakobson, Noam Chomsky, Morris Halle, Paul Postal, Edward Klima and Hu Matthews at MIT. Ross met Lakoff in 1963 and began collaborating with him especially on work by and influenced by Postal. He was a professor of linguistics at MIT from 1966–1985 and has worked in Brazil, Singapore and British Columbia.

Until Spring 2021, he taught at the University of North Texas and his class offerings there included Linguistics and Literature, Syntax, Field Methods, History of English, Semantics and Pragmatics; he also oversaw U.N.T.'s Doctorate in Poetics program.

Relating to syntactic islands, he also coined the terms "left-branch condition", "complex-np constraint", "coordinate structure constraint", and "sentential subject constraint". In phonology, he suggested the term conspiracy to Charles Kisseberth.

Like Roman Jakobson, Ross analyzes poetry using linguistics (see poetics).

Works
 Ross, John R. (1966). A proposed rule of tree-pruning. In Harvard Computation Laboratory Report to the National Science Foundation on Mathematical linguistics and automatic translation (No. NSF-17). Cambridge, MA: Harvard University Computation Laboratory.
 Ross, John R. (1966). Relativization in extraposed clauses. In Harvard Computation Laboratory Report to the National Science Foundation on Mathematical linguistics and automatic translation (No. NSF-17). Cambridge, MA: Harvard University Computation Laboratory.
 Ross, John R. (1967). Constraints on variables in syntax. (Doctoral dissertation, Massachusetts Institute of Technology). (Published as Ross 1986). (Available online at http://hdl.handle.net/1721.1/15166).
 Ross, John R. (1967). On the cyclic nature of English pronominalization. In To honor Roman Jakobson: Essays on the occasion of his seventieth birthday (No. 3, pp. 1669–1682). The Hague: Mouton.
 Ross, John R. (1969). Auxiliaries as main verbs. In W. Todd (Ed.), Studies in philosophical linguistics (Series 1). Evanston, IL: Great Expectations Press.
 Ross, John R. (1970). On declarative sentences. In R. A. Jacobs & P. S. Rosenbaum (Eds.), Readings in English transformational grammar (pp. 222–272). Washington: Georgetown University Press.
 Ross, John R. (1970). Gapping and the order of constituents. In M. Bierwisch & Karl E. Heidolph (Eds.), Progress in linguistics. The Hague: Mouton.
 Ross, John R. (1972) Act. In Donald Davidson and Gilbert Harman (Eds.), Semantics of Natural Languages, D. Reidel and Company, Dordrecht, Holland, pp. 70–126.
 Ross, John R. (1972). The category squish: Endstation Hauptwort. In Paul M. Peranteau, Judith N. Levi, Gloria C. Phares (Eds.), Proceedings of the Eighth Regional Meeting of the Chicago Linguistic Society, Chicago Linguistic Society, University of Chicago, Chicago, Illinois, pp. 316–328.
 Ross, John R. (1972). Doubl-ing. In J. Kimball (Ed.), Syntax and semantics (Vol. 1, pp. 157–186). New York: Seminar Press.
 Ross, John R. (1972). A reanalysis of English word stress (part I). In Michael K. Brame (Ed.), Contributions to generative phonology. Austin: University of Texas Press.
 Ross, John R. (1973). Slifting. In Maurice Gross and Marcel Schützenberger (Eds.),  The Formal Analysis of Natural Languages, Mouton and Company, ’s Gravenhage, Holland, pp. 133–172.
 Ross, John R. (1973).  The Penthouse Principle and the order of constituents. In Claudia Corum et al. (Eds.), You Take the High Node and I’ll Take the Low Node, Chicago Linguistic Society, University of Chicago, Chicago, Illinois, pp. 397–422.
 Ross, Haj (1982). The sound of meaning. (1982). In Linguistics in the Morning Calm, edited by the Linguistic Society of Korea, Hanshin Publishing Company, Seoul, Korea, pp. 275–290.
 Ross, Haj (1984). Inner islands. In Claudia Brugman and Monica Macauley et al. (Eds.) Proceedings of the Tenth Annual Meeting of the Berkeley Linguistics Society, Berkeley Linguistics Society, University of California, Berkeley, pp. 258 – 265.
 Ross, John R. (1986). Infinite syntax!. Norwood, NJ: ABLEX, .
 Ross, Haj (1995) Defective noun phrases. In Audra Dainora, Rachel Hemphill, Barbara Lukas, Barbara Need and Sheri Pargman (Eds.) (eds.), Proceedings of the Thirty-First Regional Meeting of the Chicago Linguistic Society, Chicago Linguistic Society, University of Chicago, Chicago, Illinois, pp. 398–440.
 Ross, Haj (2000) The frozenness of pseudoclefts – towards an inequality-based syntax. In Arika Okrent and John P. Boyle (Eds.), Proceedings of the Thirty-Sixth Regional Meeting of the Chicago Linguistic Society, Chicago Linguistic Society, University of Chicago, Chicago, Illinois, pp. 385–426.
 Ross, John R. (2004). Siamese sentences – a first look at a parallel construction. In Mary Andronis, Erin Debenport, Anne Pycha, and Keiko Yoshimura (Eds), Proceedings of the Thirty-Eighth Regional Meeting of the Chicago Linguistic Society. Chicago Linguistic Society, University of Chicago, Chicago, Illinois. pp. 569–584.

Collaborations
 Cooper, William E. and Ross, John R. (1975). Word order. In Robin E. Grossman et al. (eds.), Papers from the Parasession on Functionalism, Chicago Linguistic Society, University of Chicago, Chicago, Illinois, pp. 63–111.
 Lakoff, George; & Ross, John R. (1966). Criterion for verb phrase constituency. In Harvard Computation Laboratory Report to the National Science Foundation on Mathematical Linguistics and Automatic Translation (No. NSF-17). Cambridge, MA: Harvard University Computation Laboratory.
 Lakoff, George; & Ross, John R. (1976). Is deep structure necessary?. In J. D. McCawley (ed.), Syntax and Semantics 7 (pp. 159–164).

References

Citations

Works cited

Further reading

External links
 Dream Deep, Háj Ross's personal blog
 Bibliography by John Lawler
 Papers by Háj Ross on John Lawler's site
 Introduction to a birthday Festschrift for Háj Ross
 Linguistics department profile page at UNT

1938 births
Living people
Linguists from the United States
MIT School of Humanities, Arts, and Social Sciences alumni
MIT School of Humanities, Arts, and Social Sciences faculty
People from Boston
Syntacticians
University of North Texas College of Information faculty
University of North Texas faculty
University of Pennsylvania alumni
Yale University alumni